Fabian Davis (born 30 June 1974 in Swallowfield, East Kingston) is a Jamaican former footballer who played as a defender or midfielder.

On 7 October 2008 to January 2010, he became interim player/coach of Arnett Gardens F.C., after Jerome Waite was sacked following a poor start to the season.

Club career
Nicknamed Fabulous, he has also played for Real Mona, Harbour View F.C. and Arnett Gardens F.C., Tivoli Gardens FC, and Portmore United F.C. all in Jamaica as well as for Seattle Sounders in the USL First Division. While with Arnett Gardens, he captained the side to league titles in 2001 and 2002 and also claimed the Most Valuable Player and the Player of the Season titles those years. He went on to join Tivoli Gardens F.C. in the January 2004 transfer window and was instrumental in Tivoli Gardens winning the Premier League title in 2004.  Fabian Davis has the distinction of being the only player to cop the Most Valuable Player and Player of the season award for two separate winning premier league teams, as he picked up these awards for Tivoli Gardens F.C. in the 2003–4 season, along with the Player Personality Award. He rejoined Arnett from Portmore United in the January 2008 transfer window, and went on to serve as player coach for 1 and a half seasons from October 2008 to January 2010.

International career
A veteran of the national team, he made his debut for the Reggae Boyz in 1995 against Canada and has collected over 70 caps since, although he missed out on the 1998 FIFA World Cup squad. He usually plays wingback for the Reggae Boyz, including the 2007 Lunar Cup when Jamaica won the title.
In November 2010, Fabian captained the Jamaica national beach soccer team that failed to advance to the semi-finals of the CONCACAF championships, following narrow losses to defending champs, El Salvador, and tournament hosts Mexico.

The early years
Fabian Davis attended Kingston College and was Captain of both the Manning Cup and Colts U-16 Teams. He was also Captain of Jamaica's U-20 and U-23 football teams. Davis was also Jamaica national U-16 basketball team representative, and a member of the title winning Kingston College basketball team.

Coaching career
Fabian Davis attained the JFF Advanced Level 1 and 11 coaching certifications , as well as the United States Soccer Federation, U.S. Youth Soccer Coaching Course, National D License from Georgia State Soccer Association in July 2009. He had a successful 2008 stint as player/coach of Arnett Gardens F.C. where he took the team from 11th place in October 2008 to a 5th-place finish to end the season in 2009. A string of poor results in 2010 saw him resign as coach of the struggling Arnett Gardens outfit.

Endorsements

Davis had endorsement deals with major Jamaica brands, such as Wisynco's Bigga Soft Drink Brand in 2002 , Digicel in 2004 and with Western Sports through their Adidas brand. He has also shot campaigns for Victoria Mutual Building Society for 2011. Davis has done football analysis working with Jamaica's TVJ for the 2006 and 2010 World Cup highlights shows and on caribbean media giant, SportsMax.

See also
 2007 Lunar New Year Cup

References

External links

 
 Profile - ReggaeBoyz.com
 Profile - Golocaljamaica
 
 

1974 births
Living people
Jamaican footballers
Jamaica international footballers
Arnett Gardens F.C. players
Seattle Sounders (1994–2008) players
Harbour View F.C. players
Tivoli Gardens F.C. players
Portmore United F.C. players
Atlanta Silverbacks players
Jamaican expatriate footballers
Expatriate soccer players in the United States
A-League (1995–2004) players
Association football midfielders
Association football defenders